The 2002–03 NBA season was the fifteenth season for the Miami Heat in the National Basketball Association. The Heat had the tenth pick in the 2002 NBA draft, and selected Caron Butler from the University of Connecticut. With the continued effects of his kidney ailment, Alonzo Mourning was forced to sit out the entire season. Without their star center, the Heat struggled losing 17 of their first 22 games. They would win seven of their next nine games, but then lose six straight along the way. The Heat finished last place in the Atlantic Division with a 25–57 record, their worst since the 1990–91 season.

Scoring leader Eddie Jones was out for the remainder of the season with a groin injury after 47 games, and head coach Pat Riley was fined several times for lashing out referees following games. The only bright spot on the team was Butler, who averaged 15.4 points per game while being selected to the All-Rookie First Team. Following the season, Mourning would sign as a free agent with the New Jersey Nets, and LaPhonso Ellis retired.

Offseason

Draft picks

Roster

Roster Notes
 Center Alonzo Mourning missed the entire season due to a kidney transplant.

Regular season

Record vs. opponents

Player statistics

Season

Awards and records
Caron Butler, NBA All-Rookie Team 1st Team

References

Miami Heat seasons
Miami Heat
Miami Heat
Miami Heat